This is a comparison of open-source programming language licensing and related legal issues, covering all language implementations. Open-source programming languages are those that are released under open-source licenses.

Lists of programming languages
Programming languages